Halfhill is a surname. Notable people with the surname include:

Albert P. Halfhill (1847–1924), American groceryman and food manufacturer
Garrett Halfhill (born 1993), American soccer player